Vetovo is a village in Požega-Slavonia County, Croatia. The village is administered as a part of the city of Kutjevo.
According to national census of 2011, population of the village is 988.

Sources 

Populated places in Požega-Slavonia County